Los Angeles temple may refer to:

Thien Hau Temple (Los Angeles) - a Chinese temple located in Los Angeles's Chinatown in California, dedicated to the ocean goddess Mazu.
Senshin Buddhist Temple - a Buddhist temple in Los Angeles, California, affiliated with the Buddhist Churches of America (BCA).
Koyasan Buddhist Temple - a Japanese Buddhist temple in the Little Tokyo district of Downtown Los Angeles, California.
Los Angeles California Temple - the tenth operating and the second-largest temple operated by The Church of Jesus Christ of Latter-day Saints.
St. Louis Jain temple - a historic structure that was constructed for the 1904 St. Louis World's fairs, now standing within the Jain Center of Southern California in Los Angeles.
Amica Temple of Radiance - a new religious movement begun in 1959 in Los Angeles by Roland Hunt and Dorothy Bailey.
Angelus Temple - a Pentecostal megachurch of the International Church of the Foursquare Gospel in the Echo Park district of Los Angeles, California.
Jewish Temples in the Los Angeles metro area:
Temple Beth Am (Los Angeles, California)
Temple Israel of Hollywood
Sephardic Temple Tifereth Israel
Sinai Temple (Los Angeles)
Stephen S. Wise Temple
Temple Beth Israel of Highland Park and Eagle Rock
Wilshire Boulevard Temple